Carabus aurolimbatus is a species of ground beetle in the genus Carabus.

References

aurolimbatus